The 2000 Ju-Jitsu World Championship were the 4th edition of the Ju-Jitsu World Championships, and were held in Copenhagen, Denmark from November 25 to November 26, 2000.

Schedule 
25.11.2000 – Men's and Women's Fighting System, Women's Duo System – Classic, Mixed Duo System – Classic
26.11.2000 – Men's and Women's Fighting System, Men's Duo System – Classic

European Ju-Jitsu

Fighting System

Men's events

Women's events

Duo System

Duo Classic events

Links

References

External links
TOP3 results from DJJV.de site (PDF)